Oidaematophorus catalinae is a moth of the family Pterophoridae that is found in California.

Adults are very similar to Hellinsia caudelli, but are a little larger and slightly more yellow, with the brown subcostal shade running back to about the middle of the base of the wing. Just within the costal margin of this shade is a slender line of ground colour along the margin of the cell.

References

Oidaematophorini
Moths described in 1908
Moths of North America
Endemic fauna of California
Fauna without expected TNC conservation status